Ahmet Tevfik İleri (1911 – 31 December 1961) was a Turkish civil engineer, civil servant, politician and government minister.

Biography 

Of Hamsheni origin, was born in Hemşin ilçe (district) of Rize Province in 1911. He spent his school  years in İstanbul, and graduated from Istanbul Technical University in 1933. During his university years, he was elected as the chairman of the Turkish National Students Association (MTTB).

In 1933 at the age of 21, he began a career as supervisor engineer at the  General Directorate of Highways in Erzurum, where he worked until 1937. He was then appointed as the local manager of the Public Construction Works in Çanakkale (1937–1942) and Samsun (1942–1946). From 1946 to 1950, İleri served as the manager of the Highway Authority in Samsun.

In 1950, he joined the Democrat Party (DP), and was elected as an MP from Samsun (electoral district). During the DP-government years, he was always belonged to the party's top politicians. He served as the Minister of Transportation (22 May 1950 – 11 August 1950), Minister of National Education (13 April – 25 November 1957 and 22 May 1959 – 8 December 1959 as placeholder), Deputy Prime Minister (25 November 1957 – 19 January 1958) and Minister of Public Works (19 January 1958 – 27 May 1960).

After the 1960 Turkish coup d'état, he was tried and imprisoned. However, he was hospitalized in 1961, and died in Ankara on 31 December the same year. He was buried at Cebeci Asri Cemetery in Ankara.

References

Sources

External links

1911 births
People from Hemşin
Istanbul Technical University alumni
Turkish civil engineers
Turkish civil servants
Democrat Party (Turkey, 1946–1961) politicians
Deputies of Samsun
Members of the 19th government of Turkey
Members of the 20th government of Turkey
Members of the 22nd government of Turkey
Members of the 23rd government of Turkey
Ministers of Transport and Communications of Turkey
Ministers of Public Works of Turkey
Ministers of National Education of Turkey
Deputy Prime Ministers of Turkey
1961 deaths
Burials at Cebeci Asri Cemetery
Turkish people of Hemshin descent
20th-century Turkish engineers